Turbo Golf Racing is a vehicular golf racing video game developed by Hugecalf Studios and published by Secret Mode. The game was first released into early-access on August 4, 2022, for Windows, Xbox One and Xbox Series X/S. The game was released under the Xbox Game Pass subscription service on the same day.

Gameplay 

In Turbo Golf Racing, players control a boost-enabled car to hit a ball to a hole on various courses. Players must attempt to keep the ball within the confines of the course and handle hazards such as sand traps and rough terrain which will slow the ball and vehicle while attempting to get their ball to the goal as fast as possible.

Cars are equipped with boosters which can be used to speed up the vehicle and wings that allow players to glide across the course. Players can also equip 'Power Cores' prior to joining a game, which provide various upgrades such as increased boost speed and changing the ball size, bounce and direction.

Courses include boost pads to increase the speed of vehicles and recharge boost, rings which launch the ball and vehicles though the air. The game contains various courses, split into 3 styling groups: Urban, Industrial, and Wild.

Turbo Golf Racing features two distinct play modes. In the single-player mode, players gain stars by beating set times on each course. In the multi-player mode, players race against up to 8 opponents to score their ball in the hole over the course of 3 rounds. This mode includes power-ups that players can pick up, such as missiles to strike and slow down opponents and shields to block against them. Points are gained by getting to the goal before your opponents and are added up at the end of the 3 rounds to determine the winner. 

Playing the various modes rewards the player with currency, which can be used to purchase unlockable cosmetic items. In addition, a Season Pass leveling structure allows for unlocking additional items as the player progresses.

Development 
After releasing their first game When Ski Lifts Go Wrong in 2019, European indie video game development studio, Hugecalf Studios, announced Turbo Golf Racing at the Future Games Show on March 24, 2022. Producer Jonny Hughes, is quoted during this saying, “Turbo Golf Racing is the game we’ve always dreamed of making.” The game was available for open-beta testing on April 28 until May 2. On June 11, 2022, the early-access release date was also announced along with announcing an additional open-beta period that would run until June 20.

On August 4, 2022, Turbo Golf Racing released into early-access, initially releasing with 30 levels. It received its first update on August 12, adding 6 courses along with various cosmetic items and bug fixes.

References

External links 
 Official website

Upcoming video games
Early access video games
Windows games
Xbox One games
Xbox Series X and Series S games
Racing video games